The Entomological Magazine is a publication devoted to entomology.

The Entomological Magazine was published between September 1832 and October 1838 by the Society of Entomologists of London. The editor was  Edward Newman aided by Francis Walker.The work includes reviews of entomological literature, articles and systematic papers in which new species are described. Contributors include John Curtis, Edward Doubleday ("Communications on the Natural History of North America."), Alexander Henry Haliday (notably An essay on the classification of the parasitic Hymenoptera... of Britain which correspond with the Ichneumones minuti of Linnaeus), George Robert Waterhouse, John Obadiah Westwood, William John Swainson, Francis Walker ( notably Monographia Chalciditum ), George Thomas Rudd, William Edward Shuckard, James Charles Dale, James Francis Stephens and Frederick William Hope
 
The Entomological Magazine was discontinued following controversy. Newman writes a "Valedictory Address" in Volume 5.

The Entomologist
The Entomological  Magazine was succeeded by The Entomologist published in London by Edward Newman between 1840 and [1869] in four volumes:
Volume 1 November 1840-October 1842;
Volume 2 May 1864-December 1865;
Volume 3 January 1866-November 1867;
Volume 4 January 1868-December 1869.

This in turn was succeeded by Newman's Entomologist published  by Simpkin, Marshall & Co. at London [1869-1876] and from that date until 1973 (volume 106)  as, once more, The Entomologist. Around World War I, it was edited by Richard South.

References

Evenhuis, N.L., Litteratura Taxonomica Dipterorum (1758–1930). 2 vols. Backhuys Publishers, Leiden

External links
BHL Digitised text of the Entomological Magazine
BHL Scans of The Entomologist Volumes 1–4 
BHL Scans of Newman's Entomologist Volumes  5–9 (1870–1876)
 BHL  Scans of The Entomologist Volumes 10–55 (1877–1922)

Entomological literature
Magazines established in 1832
Magazines disestablished in 1838
Entomology journals and magazines
Magazines published in London
Defunct magazines published in the United Kingdom